Tapen Sen (born 2 September 1953) is a former judge of the Calcutta High Court, the Punjab and Haryana High Court and the Jharkhand High Court and is currently holding the chair as the President of the Jharkhand State Consumer Disputes Redressal Commission.

Early life
Born into a wealthy household in Hazaribagh, he completed his schooling from St. Xavier's School and passed his Indian School Examination conducted by the University of Cambridge Local examination Syndicate, U.K. by securing first Division in 1970. He graduated from St. Columba's College, Hazaribag in 1974. He passed his LL.B. Examination from Chotanagpur Law College Ranchi in 1979.

Career
He joined Ranchi Bench of Patna High Court in 1980 and handled cases including writs, criminal law, civil law, arbitration, matrimonial disputes and labour disputes. He was appointed counsel for the State Government of Bihar as Government Pleader for the Ranchi Bench of the Patna High Court on 25 July 1997, which he declined citing personal reasons. He was retained as counsel for various state owned enterprises.

He was elevated as a Permanent Judge of the Jharkhand High Court on 28 January 2002.

References

External links
 Jharkhand High Court
 National Consumer Disputes Redressal Commission

1953 births
Living people
Judges of the Calcutta High Court
Judges of the Punjab and Haryana High Court
Judges of the Jharkhand High Court
21st-century Indian judges